Visay Phaphouvanin (born 12 June 1985) is Laotian professional footballer who plays as a striker. He is a member of Laos national football team, for which he played at the 2010 AFF Suzuki Cup and 2014 FIFA World Cup qualifiers.

International goals
Scores and results list Laos' goal tally first.

References

External links
 FIFA.com statistics
 Goal.com profile

1985 births
Living people
People from Vientiane
Laotian footballers
Association football forwards
Laos international footballers